3C-AL is a psychedelic phenethylamine with structural similarities to allylescaline.  Little information exists on the human pharmacology of 3C-AL and it has little-to-no history of human use. It can be synthesized from syringaldehyde by reaction with allyl iodide followed by condensation with nitroethane and reduction. The hydrochloride salt is a white crystal with a melting point of 180–181°C.

See also
2C-AL
2C-T-16
3C-MAL
3C-P
Allylescaline
Substituted phenethylamine

References

External Links
Explore 3C-AL | Pihkal.info

Mescalines
Substituted amphetamines
O-methylated phenols